The San Francisco Giants are an American baseball team. Their 2011 season marked their 129th year in Major League Baseball, their fifty-fourth year in San Francisco since their move from New York following the 1957 season, and their 12th in AT&T Park. They opened the 2011 season as the defending World Series champions on March 31, 2011. However, they were eliminated from post-season contention on September 24, 2011, finishing eight games behind that season's National League West champion Arizona Diamondbacks. Despite missing the playoffs, the Giants led the majors in ninth inning comebacks.

Regular season
Coming off the team's 2010 World Series success and his two-year, $22 million contract, Aubrey Huff arrived at 2011 spring training out of shape. His OPS dropped 215 points from the previous season to .676, last among Major League first baseman in 2011. Well-intentioned fans sent him thongs throughout the season in hopes of improving his fortunes. Huff was accountable for his struggles contributing to the team's failure to return to the playoffs in 2011. During the top of the 12th inning in a game against the Marlins on May 25, 2011, Scott Cousins collided with Buster Posey at home plate. It was revealed that Posey had fractures in his lower left leg and ankle and would be out of the rest of the season. Some drew comparisons of the collision with a similar collision during the 1970 All-Star game when Pete Rose collided with Ray Fosse.  Without Posey's presence in the lineup, the Giants would only manage to score 570 runs on offense and missed the postseason.

 November 30, 2010 – The Giants sign free agent IF Miguel Tejada to a one-year contract.
 December 3, 2010 – The Giants re-sign free agent OF Pat Burrell to a one-year contract.
 March 30, 2011 – As spring training concludes, the Giants add rookie 1B Brandon Belt to the 25-man roster and 1B Travis Ishikawa is designated for assignment.
 April 20, 2011 – With LF Cody Ross returning from the disabled list, Brandon Belt is optioned to Fresno.
 April 28, 2011 – P Ryan Vogelsong, replacing an injured Barry Zito makes his first major league start since 2004, earning the win.
 April 30, 2011 – 3B Pablo Sandoval breaks the hamate bone in his right hand and is placed on the disabled list.
 May 25, 2011 – C Buster Posey fractures his lower left leg and ankle in a collision at home plate with Scott Cousins of the Florida Marlins, ending his season.
 May 26, 2011 – SS Brandon Crawford is added to the 40-man roster and promoted to San Francisco from San Jose. Ryan Rohlinger is designated for assignment.
 June 10, 2011 – IF Freddy Sanchez suffers a dislocated shoulder while diving for a ball in a game against the Cincinnati Reds.
 June 13, 2011 – 3B Pablo Sandoval is activated from the disabled list.
 June 28, 2011 – P Barry Zito returns to the mound after more than two months on the disabled list, earning the win to complete a doubleheader sweep of the Chicago Cubs. Zito replaces an injured Jonathan Sánchez in the rotation.
 July 3, 2011 – Pitchers Matt Cain, Tim Lincecum, Ryan Vogelsong, and Brian Wilson are named to the All-Star Team.
 July 10, 2011 – 3B Pablo Sandoval is named to the All-Star Team as an injury replacement for José Reyes.
 July 14, 2011 – 2B/3B Mike Fontenot is activated from the disabled list.
 July 19, 2011 – The Giants acquire IF Jeff Keppinger in a trade with the Houston Astros and recall Brandon Belt from the minors for the third time in 2011.
 July 27, 2011 – The Giants acquire OF Carlos Beltrán in a trade with the New York Mets for prospect P Zack Wheeler.
 July 31, 2011 – The Giants acquire IF Orlando Cabrera in a trade with the Cleveland Indians for prospect OF Thomas Neal.
 August 27, 2011 – LHP Eric Surkamp is promoted from AA Richmond and makes his major league debut in a start against the Houston Astros, earning a no-decision.
 August 31, 2011 – OF Aaron Rowand and IF Miguel Tejada are designated for assignment. IF Brett Pill is promoted from Fresno and OF Pat Burrell is activated from the disabled list
 September 6, 2011 – 1B Brett Pill hits a home run off Wade LeBlanc of the San Diego Padres in his first at bat in the major leagues.
 September 15, 2011 – 3B Pablo Sandoval hits for the cycle at Coors Field against the Colorado Rockies.
 September 23, 2011 – The Giants are eliminated from the NL Western division with a 3-1 loss to the Arizona Diamondbacks, who simultaneously clinch the divisional title.
 September 24, 2011 – The Giants are eliminated from postseason contention with a 15-2 loss in Arizona.

Season standings

Record vs. opponents

Game log

|-  style="text-align:center; background:#fbb;"
| 1 || March 31 || @ Dodgers || L 2–1 || Kershaw (1–0) || Lincecum (0–1) || Broxton (1) || 56,000 || 0–1 
|-

|-  style="text-align:center; background:#fbb;"
| 2 || April 1 || @ Dodgers || L 4–3 || Billingsley (1–0) || Sánchez (0–1) || Broxton (2) || 44,834 || 0–2
|-  style="text-align:center; background:#bfb;"
| 3 || April 2 || @ Dodgers || W 10–0 || Cain (1–0) || Lilly (0–1) || || 40,809 || 1–2
|-  style="text-align:center; background:#fbb;"
| 4 || April 3 || @ Dodgers || L 7–5 || Kuroda (1–0) || Runzler (0–1) || Broxton (3) || 50,896 || 1–3
|-  style="text-align:center; background:#fbb;"
| 5 || April 5 || @ Padres || L 3–1 || Harang (1–0) || Bumgarner (0–1) || Bell (2) || 43,146 || 1–4
|-  style="text-align:center; background:#bfb;"
| 6 || April 6 || @ Padres  || W 8–4 || Lincecum (1–1) || Stauffer (0–1) || Ramírez (1) || 24,368 || 2–4
|-  style="text-align:center; background:#bfb;"
| 7 || April 8 || Cardinals || W 5–4  (12) || Runzler (1–1) || Tallet (0–1) || || 42,048 || 3–4
|-  style="text-align:center; background:#bfb;"
| 8 || April 9 || Cardinals || W 3–2 || Ramírez (1–0) || Franklin (0–1) || || 41,742 || 4–4
|-  style="text-align:center; background:#fbb;"
| 9 || April 10 || Cardinals || L 6–1 || Lohse (1–1) || Zito (0–1) || || 42,092 || 4–5
|-  style="text-align:center; background:#fbb;"
| 10 || April 11 || Dodgers || L 6–1 || Kershaw (2–1) || Bumgarner (0–2) || || 40,870 || 4–6
|-  style="text-align:center; background:#bfb;"
| 11 || April 12 || Dodgers || W 5–4 || Affeldt (1–0) || Hawksworth (1–1) || Wilson (1) || 41,960 || 5–6
|-  style="text-align:center; background:#bfb;"
| 12 || April 13 || Dodgers || W 4–3 || Sánchez (1–1) || Lilly (0–2) || Wilson (2) || 42,060 || 6–6
|-  style="text-align:center; background:#bfb;"
| 13 || April 15 || @ Diamondbacks || W 5–2 || Cain (2–0) || Hudson (0–3) || Wilson (3) || 23,090 || 7–6
|-  style="text-align:center; background:#bfb;"
| 14 || April 16 || @ Diamondbacks || W 5–3 || Mota (1–0) || Saunders (0–2) || Wilson (4) || 25,590 || 8–6
|-  style="text-align:center; background:#fbb;"
| 15 || April 17 || @ Diamondbacks || L 6–5 (12) || Collmenter (1–0) || Runzler (1–2) ||  || 26,195 || 8–7
|-  style="text-align:center; background:#bfb;"
| 16 || April 18 || @ Rockies || W 8–1 || Lincecum (2–1) || Rogers (2–1) || || 31,079 || 9–7
|-  style="text-align:center; background:#bfb;"
| 17 || April 19 || @ Rockies || W 6–3 || Sánchez (2–1) || Jiménez (0–1) || Wilson (5) || 30,320 || 10–7
|-  style="text-align:center; background:#fbb;"
| 18 || April 20 || @ Rockies || L 10–2 || de la Rosa (3–0) || Cain (2–1) || || 27,758 || 10–8
|- style="text-align:center; background:#fbb;"
| 19 || April 22 || Braves || L 4–1 || Hanson (2–3) || Bumgarner (0–3) || Kimbrel (5) || 42,404 || 10–9
|- style="text-align:center; background:#fbb;"
| 20 || April 23 || Braves || L 5–2 || Hudson (3–2) || Lincecum (2–2) || Kimbrel (6) || 42,395 || 10–10
|- style="text-align:center; background:#fbb;"
| 21 || April 24 || Braves || L 9–6  (10) || O'Flaherty (1–1) || Wilson (0–1) || Venters (1) || 42,295 || 10–11 
|-  style="text-align:center; background:#bfb;"
| 22 || April 26 || @ Pirates || W 6–3 || Romo (1–0) || Hanrahan (0–1) || Wilson (6) || 9,832 || 11–11 
|-  style="text-align:center; background:#fbb;"
| 23 || April 27 || @ Pirates || L 2–0 || McDonald (1–2) || Bumgarner (0–4) || Hanrahan (7) || 9,048 || 11–12 
|-  style="text-align:center; background:#bfb;"
| 24 || April 28 || @ Pirates || W 5–2 || Vogelsong (1–0) || Karstens (2–1) || Wilson (7) || 14,747 || 12–12
|-  style="text-align:center; background:#fbb;"
| 25 || April 29 || @ Nationals || L 3–0 || Marquis (3–0) || Lincecum (2–3) || || 21,399 || 12–13
|-  style="text-align:center; background:#bfb;"
| 26 || April 30 || @ Nationals || W 2–1 || Mota (2–0) || Lannan (2–3) || Wilson (8) || 28,766 || 13–13
|-

|-  style="text-align:center; background:#fbb;"
| 27 || May 1 || @ Nationals || L 5–2 || Zimmermann (2–4) || Cain (2–2) || Storen (5) || 21,611 || 13–14
|-  style="text-align:center; background:#fbb;"
| 28 || May 2 || @ Nationals || L 2–0 || Gorzelanny (1–2) || Bumgarner (0–5) || Storen (6) || 15,342 || 13–15
|-  style="text-align:center; background:#bfb;"
| 29 || May 3 || @ Mets || W 7–6 (10) || López (1–0) || Buchholz (1–1) || Wilson (9) || 32,288 || 14–15
|-  style="text-align:center; background:#bfb;"
| 30 || May 4 || @ Mets || W 2–0 || Lincecum (3–3) || Capuano (2–3) || Wilson (10) || 29,333 || 15–15
|-  style="text-align:center; background:#fbb;"
| 31 || May 5 || @ Mets || L 5–2 || Pelfrey (2–3) || Sánchez (2–2) || Rodríguez (7) || 23,433 || 15–16
|-  style="text-align:center; background:#bfb;"
| 32 || May 6 || Rockies || W 4–3 || Wilson (1–1) || Paulino (0–2) ||  || 41,982 || 16–16
|-  style="text-align:center; background:#bfb;"
| 33 || May 7 || Rockies || W 3–2 || Wilson (2–1) || Paulino (0–3) ||  || 41,611 || 17–16
|-  style="text-align:center; background:#bfb;"
| 34 || May 8 || Rockies || W 3–0 || Vogelsong (2–0) || de la Rosa (4–1) || Wilson (11) || 42,132 || 18–16
|-  style="text-align:center; background:#bfb;"
| 35 || May 10 || Diamondbacks || W 1–0 || Wilson (3–1) || Hernandez (2–1) ||  || 41,039 || 19–16
|-  style="text-align:center; background:#bfb;"
| 36 || May 11 || Diamondbacks || W 4–3 || Sánchez (3–2) || Galarraga (3–3) || Wilson (12) || 41,026 || 20–16
|-  style="text-align:center; background:#bfb;"
| 37 || May 12 || Diamondbacks || W 3–2 || Cain (3–2) || Hudson (3–5) || López (1) || 41,126 || 21–16
|-  style="text-align:center; background:#fbb;"
| 38 || May 13 || @ Cubs || L 11–4 || Dempster (2–4) || Bumgarner (0–6) || || 37,433 || 21–17
|-  style="text-align:center; background:#bfb;"
| 39 || May 14 || @ Cubs || W 3–0 (6)† || Vogelsong (3–0) || Davis (0–1) ||  || 39,706 || 22–17
|-  style="text-align:center; background:#bbb;"
| – || May 15 || @ Cubs  || colspan=6 | Postponed (rain) Rescheduled for June 28
|-  style="text-align:center; background:#fbb;"
| 40 || May 16 || @ Rockies || L 7–4 || Mortensen  (1–0) || Lincecum (3–4) || Street (13) || 33,228 || 22–18
|-  style="text-align:center; background:#fbb;"
| 41 || May 17 || @ Rockies || L 5–3 || Belisle (4–2) || Sánchez (3–3) || Street (14) || 41,105 || 22–19
|-  style="text-align:center; background:#bfb;"
| 42 || May 18 || @ Dodgers || W 8–5 || Wilson (4–1) || Cormier (0–1) ||  || 30,421 || 23–19
|-  style="text-align:center; background:#bfb;"
| 43 || May 19 || @ Dodgers || W 3–1 || Bumgarner (1–6) || Billingsley (2–4) || Wilson (13) || 34,248 || 24–19
|-  style="text-align:center; background:#bfb;"
| 44 || May 20 || Athletics || W 2–1 (10) || López (2–0) || Fuentes (1–5) ||  || 42,224 || 25–19
|-  style="text-align:center; background:#bfb;"
| 45 || May 21 || Athletics || W 3–0 || Lincecum (4–4) || Anderson (2–4) ||  || 42,152 || 26–19
|-  style="text-align:center; background:#bfb;"
| 46 || May 22 || Athletics || W 5–4 (11) || Romo (2–0) || Fuentes (1–6) ||  || 42,288 || 27–19
|-  style="text-align:center; background:#fbb;"
| 47 || May 24 || Marlins || L 5–1 || Nolasco (4–0) || Cain (3–3) || Núñez (18) || 41,165 || 27–20
|-  style="text-align:center; background:#fbb;"
| 48 || May 25 || Marlins || L 7–6 (12) || Webb (1–3) || Mota (2–1) || Badenhop (1) || 41,037 || 27–21
|-  style="text-align:center; background:#fbb;"
| 49 || May 26 || Marlins || L 1–0 || Sánchez (4–1) || Vogelsong (3–1) ||  || 41,472 || 27–22
|-  style="text-align=:center; background:#bfb;"
| 50 || May 27 || @ Brewers || W 5–4 || Lincecum (5–4) || Marcum (6–2) || Wilson (14) || 37,034 || 28–22
|-  style="text-align:center; background:#fbb;"
| 51 || May 28 || @ Brewers || L 3–2 || Axford (1–1) || Mota (2–2) ||  || 42,512 || 28–23
|-  style="text-align:center; background:#fbb;"
| 52 || May 29 || @ Brewers || L 6–0 || Gallardo (7–2) || Cain (3–4) ||  || 43,035 || 28–24
|-  style="text-align=:center; background:#bfb;"
| 53 || May 30 || @ Cardinals || W 7–3 || Bumgarner (2–6) || McClellan (6–2) ||  || 40,849 || 29–24
|-  style="text-align:center; background:#fbb;"
| 54 || May 31 || @ Cardinals || L 4–3 || Franklin (1–3) || López (2–1) || Salas (10) || 37,748 || 29–25
|-

|-  style="text-align=:center; background:#bfb;"
| 55 || June 1 || @ Cardinals || W 7–5 (11) || Romo (3–0) || Franklin (1–4) || Wilson (15) || 35,775 || 30–25
|-  style="text-align=:center; background:#bfb;"
| 56 || June 2 || @ Cardinals || W 12–7 || Sánchez (4–3) || Lynn (0–1) || Affeldt (1) || 34,104 || 31–25
|-  style="text-align=:center; background:#bfb;"
| 57 || June 3 || Rockies || W 3–1 || Cain (4–4) || Nicasio (1–1) || Wilson (16) || 41,021 || 32–25
|-  style="text-align=:center; background:#fbb;"
| 58 || June 4 || Rockies || L 2–1 || Chacín (6–4) || Bumgarner (2–7) || Street (15) || 41,046 || 32–26
|-  style="text-align=:center; background:#bfb;"
| 59 || June 5 || Rockies || W 2–1 || Vogelsong (4–1) || Lindstrom (0–1) || Wilson (17) || 41,369 || 33–26
|-  style="text-align=:center; background:#bfb;"
| 60 || June 6 || Nationals || W 5–4 (13) || Lopez (3–1) || Stammen (0–1) ||  || 41,180 || 34–26
|-  style="text-align=:center; background:#fbb;"
| 61 || June 7 || Nationals || L 2–1 || Zimmermann (4–6) || Sánchez (4–4) || Storen (12) || 41,786 || 34–27
|-  style="text-align=:center; background:#bfb;"
| 62 || June 8 || Nationals || W 3–1 || Cain (5–4) || Burnett (1–3) ||  || 41,738 || 35–27
|-  style="text-align:center; background:#fbb;"
| 63 || June 9 || Reds || L 3–0 || Cueto (3–2) || Bumgarner (2–8) || Cordero (12) || 41,106 || 35–28
|-  style="text-align=:center; background:#bfb;"
| 64 || June 10 || Reds || W 3–2 || Wilson (5–1) || Arredondo (0–1) ||  || 41,686 || 36–28
|-  style="text-align:center; background:#fbb;"
| 65 || June 11 || Reds || L 10–2 || Leake (6–2) || Lincecum (5–5) ||  || 41,735 || 36–29
|-  style="text-align=:center; background:#bfb;"
| 66 || June 12 || Reds || W 4–2 || Ramírez (2–0) || Arredondo (0–2) || Wilson (18) || 42,084 || 37–29
|-  style="text-align=:center; background:#bfb;"
| 67 || June 14 || @ Diamondbacks || W 6–5 || Cain (6–4) || Collmenter (4–2) || Wilson (19) || 23,746 || 38–29
|-  style="text-align=:center; background:#bfb;"
| 68 || June 15 || @ Diamondbacks || W 5–2 || Bumgarner (3–8) || Saunders (3–7) || Wilson (20) || 24,194 || 39–29
|-  style="text-align=:center; background:#fbb;"
| 69 || June 16 || @ Diamondbacks || L 3–2 (10) || Hernandez (3–2) || Casilla (0–1) ||  || 23,468 || 39–30
|-  style="text-align=:center; background:#fbb;"
| 70 || June 17 || @ Athletics || L 5–2 || Godfrey (1–0) ||  Lincecum (5–6) || Bailey (3) || 36,067 || 39–31
|-  style="text-align=:center; background:#fbb;"
| 71 || June 18 || @ Athletics || L 4–2 || Ziegler (2–0) || Sánchez (4–5) || Bailey (4) || 36,067 || 39–32
|-  style="text-align=:center; background:#fbb;"
| 72 || June 19 || @ Athletics || L 2–1 || Cahill (7–5) || Affeldt (1–1) || Fuentes (12) || 36,067 || 39–33
|-  style="text-align=:center; background:#fbb;"
| 73 || June 21 || Twins || L 9–2 || Pavano (5–5) || Bumgarner (3–9) || || 41,958 || 39–34
|-  style="text-align=:center; background:#bfb;"
| 74 || June 22 || Twins || W 5–1 || Vogelsong (5–1) || Blackburn (6–5) ||  || 41,886 || 40–34
|-  style="text-align=:center; background:#bfb;"
| 75 || June 23 || Twins || W 2–1 || Lincecum (6–6) || Duensing (4–7) || Wilson (21) || 42,481 || 41–34
|-  style="text-align=:center; background:#bfb;"
| 76 || June 24 || Indians || W 4–3 || Casilla (1–1) || Carrasco (7–4) || Wilson (22) || 41,690 || 42–34
|-  style="text-align=:center; background:#bfb;"
| 77 || June 25 || Indians || W 1–0 || Cain (7–4) || Masterson (5–6) || Wilson (23) || 42,130 || 43–34
|-  style="text-align=:center; background:#bfb;"
| 78 || June 26 || Indians || W 3–1 || Bumgarner (4–9) || Carmona (4–10) || Affeldt (2) || 41,978 || 44–34
|-  style="text-align=:center; background:#bfb;"
| 79 || June 28 From May 15 || @ Cubs || W 13–7 || Vogelsong (6–1) || Davis (1–7) ||  || 39,157 || 45–34
|-  style="text-align=:center; background:#bfb;"
| 80 || June 28‡ || @ Cubs || W 6–2 || Zito (1–1) || López (0–2) || Wilson (24) || 38,360 || 46–34
|-  style="text-align=:center; background:#fbb;"
| 81 || June 29 || @ Cubs || L 2–1 || Mármol (2–2) || Romo (3–1) ||  || 37,221 || 46–35
|-  style="text-align=:center; background:#fbb;"
| 82 || June 30 || @ Cubs || L 5–2 (13) || Grabow (1–0) || Ramírez (2–1) ||  || 38,158 || 46–36
|-

|-  style="text-align=:center; background:#bfb;"
| 83 || July 1 || @ Tigers || W 4–3 || Wilson (6–1) || Valverde (2–3) || Affeldt (3) || 35,583 || 47–36
|-  style="text-align=:center; background:#bfb;"
| 84 || July 2 || @ Tigers || W 15–3 || Zito (2–1) || Scherzer (9–4) || Mota (1) || 38,983 || 48–36
|-  style="text-align=:center; background:#fbb;"
| 85 || July 3 || @ Tigers || L 6–3 || Porcello (7–6) || Affeldt (1–2) || Valverde (20) || 31,904 || 48–37
|-  style="text-align=:center; background:#fbb;"
| 86 || July 4 || Padres || L 5–3 || Richard (5–9) || Lincecum (6–7) || Bell (25) || 42,300 || 48–38
|-  style="text-align=:center; background:#fbb;"
| 87 || July 5 || Padres || L 5–3 || Stauffer (5–5) || Cain (7–5) || Bell (26) || 41,403 || 48–39
|-  style="text-align=:center; background:#bfb;"
| 88 || July 6 || Padres || W 6–5 (14) || Lopez (4–1) || Neshek (1–1) ||  || 41,916 || 49–39
|-  style="text-align=:center; background:#bfb;"
| 89 || July 7 || Padres || W 2–1 || Zito (3–1) || Luebke (2–3) || Wilson (25) || 41,521 || 50–39
|-  style="text-align=:center; background:#fbb;"
| 90 || July 8 || Mets || L 5–2 || Beato (2–1) || Wilson (6–2) || Rodríguez (23) || 41,028 || 50–40
|-  style="text-align=:center; background:#bfb;"
| 91 || July 9 || Mets || W 3–1 || Lincecum (7–7) || Capuano (8–8) || Romo (1) || 42,117 || 51–40
|-  style="text-align=:center; background:#bfb;"
| 92 || July 10 || Mets || W 4–2 || Cain (8–5) || Pelfrey (5–8) || Wilson (26) || 42,123 || 52–40
|-  style="text-align=:center; background:#bfb;"
| 93 || July 14 || @ Padres || W 6–2 (12) || Casilla (2–1) || Gregerson (2–3) || Wilson (27) || 32,292 || 53–40
|-  style="text-align=:center; background:#bfb;"
| 94 || July 15 || @ Padres || W 6–1 || Lincecum (8–7) || Moseley (2–9) ||  || 42,055 || 54–40
|-  style="text-align=:center; background:#fbb;"
| 95 || July 16 || @ Padres || L 11–3 || Luebke (3–3) || Zito (3–2) ||  || 42,024 || 54–41
|-  style="text-align=:center; background:#bfb;"
| 96 || July 17 || @ Padres || W 4–3 (11) || Lopez (5–1) || Qualls (4–4) || Wilson (28) || 36,351 || 55–41
|-  style="text-align=:center; background:#bfb;"
| 97 || July 18 || Dodgers || W 5–0 || Vogelsong (7–1) || Billingsley (8–8) ||  || 42,323 || 56–41
|-  style="text-align=:center; background:#bfb;"
| 98 || July 19  || Dodgers || W 5–3 || Bumgarner (5–9) || Kuo (0–1) || Wilson (29) || 42,391 || 57–41
|- style="text-align=:center; background:#fbb;"
| 99 || July 20 || Dodgers || L 1–0 || Kershaw (11–4) || Lincecum (8–8) || Guerra (6) || 42,487 || 57–42
|- style="text-align=:center; background:#fbb;"
| 100 || July 22 || Brewers || L 4–2 || Marcum (9–3) || Cain (8–6) || Axford (27) || 42,297 || 57–43
|-  style="text-align=:center; background:#bfb;"
| 101 || July 23 || Brewers || W 4–2 || Vogelsong (8–1) || Wolf (6–8) || Wilson (30) || 42,277 || 58–43
|-  style="text-align=:center; background:#bfb;"
| 102 || July 24 || Brewers || W 2–1 || Bumgarner (6–9) || Gallardo (11–7) || Wilson (31) || 42,262 || 59–43
|- style="text-align=:center; background:#fbb;"
| 103 || July 26  || @ Phillies || L 7–2 || Worley (7–1) || Zito (3–3) ||  || 45,740 || 59–44
|-  style="text-align=:center; background:#bfb;"
| 104 || July 27 || @ Phillies || W 2–1 || Cain (9–6) || Hamels (12–6) || Wilson (32)  || 45,800 || 60–44
|-  style="text-align=:center; background:#bfb;"
| 105 || July 28 || @ Phillies || W 4–1 || Lincecum (9–8) || Kendrick (5–5) || Wilson (33) || 45,646 || 61–44
|-  style="text-align=:center; background:#fbb;"
| 106 || July 29 || @ Reds || L 4–3 (13) || Arredondo (2–3) || Wilson (6–3) ||  || 29,016 || 61–45
|-  style="text-align=:center; background:#fbb;"
| 107 || July 30 || @ Reds || L 7–2 || Leake (9–6) || Bumgarner (6–10) ||  || 40,402 || 61–46
|-  style="text-align=:center; background:#fbb;"
| 108 || July 31 || @ Reds ||L 9–0 || Cueto (7–4) || Zito (3–4) ||  || 37,864 || 61–47
|-

|- style="text-align=:center; background:#fbb;"
| 109 || August 1 || Diamondbacks || L 5–2 || Kennedy (13–3) || Cain (9–7) || Putz (25) || 42,366 || 61–48
|- style="text-align=:center; background:#fbb;"
| 110 || August 2 || Diamondbacks || L 6–1 || Hudson (11–7) || Lincecum (9–9) ||  || 42,332 || 61–49
|- style="text-align=:center; background:#bfb;"
| 111 || August 3 || Diamondbacks || W 8–1 || Vogelsong (9–1) || Marquis (8–6) ||  || 42,477 || 62–49
|- style="text-align=:center; background:#fbb;"
| 112 || August 4 || Phillies || L 3–0 || Lee (11–7) || Bumgarner (6–11) ||  || 42,013 || 62–50
|- style="text-align=:center; background:#fbb;"
| 113 || August 5 || Phillies || L 9–2 || Worley (8–1) ||  Sánchez (4–6) || || 42,165 || 62–51
|- style="text-align=:center; background:#fbb;"
| 114 || August 6 || Phillies || L 2–1 || Hamels (13–6) || Cain (9–8) || || 42,183 || 62–52
|- style="text-align=:center; background:#bfb;"
| 115 || August 7 || Phillies || W 3–1 || Lincecum (10–9) || Oswalt (4–7) || Wilson (34) || 42,366 || 63–52
|- style="text-align=:center; background:#fbb;"
| 116 || August 8 || Pirates || L 5–0 || Morton (9–6) || Vogelsong (9–2) || || 42,405 || 63–53
|- style="text-align=:center; background:#bfb;"
| 117 || August 9 || Pirates || W 6–0 || Bumgarner (7–11) || McDonald (7–6) || || 42,648 || 64–53
|- style="text-align=:center; background:#fbb;"
| 118 || August 10 || Pirates || L 9–2 || Karstens (9–6) || Sánchez (4–7) ||  || 42,603 || 64–54
|- style="text-align=:center; background:#fbb;"
| 119 || August 12 || @ Marlins || L 2–1 || Nolasco (9–8) || Cain (9–9) || Núñez (32) || 22,431 || 64–55
|- style="text-align=:center; background:#bfb;"
| 120 || August 13 || @ Marlins || W 3–0 || Lincecum (11–9) || Vasquez (7–10) || Wilson (35) || 25, 013 || 65–55
|- style="text-align=:center; background:#bfb;"
| 121 || August 14 || @ Marlins || W 5–2 || Vogelsong (10–2) || Volstad (5–9) || Ramírez (2) || 20,020 || 66–55 
|- style="text-align=:center; background:#fbb;"
| 122 || August 15 || @ Braves || L 5–4 || Martínez (1–2) || Wilson (6–4)  ||  || 23,498 || 66–56 
|- style="text-align=:center; background:#fbb;"
| 123 || August 16 || @ Braves || L 2–1 (11) || Arodys Vizcaíno (1–0) || Lopez (5–2) ||  || 22,108 || 66–57 
|- style="text-align=:center; background:#bfb;"
| 124 || August 17 || @ Braves || W 7–5 || Cain (10–9) || Jurrjens (12–5) ||  || 22,202 || 67–57
|- style="text-align=:center; background:#fbb;"
| 125 || August 18 || @ Braves || L 1–0 || Minor (3–2) || Lincecum (11–10) || Kimbrel (37) || 30,720 || 67–58
|- style="text-align=:center; background:#fbb;"
| 126 || August 19 || @ Astros || L 6–0 || Rodríguez (9–9) || Vogelsong (10–3) ||  || 26,259 || 67–59
|- style="text-align=:center; background:#fbb;"
| 127 || August 20 || @ Astros || L 7–5 || Lyles (2–7) || Bumgarner (7–12) || Melancon (13) || 29,046 || 67–60 
|- style="text-align=:center; background:#bfb;"
| 128 || August 21 || @ Astros || W 6–4 (11) || Affeldt (2–2) || Melancon (6–4) || Ramírez (3) || 25,838 || 68–60
|- style="text-align=:center; background:#fbb;"
| 129 || August 23 || Padres || L 7–5 || Hamren (1–0) || Ramírez (2–2) || Bell (35) || 41,288 || 68–61
|- style="text-align=:center; background:#bfb;"
| 130 || August 24 || Padres || W 2–1 || Lincecum (12–10) || Stauffer (8–10) || Casilla (1) || 41,542 || 69–61
|- style="text-align=:center; background:#fbb;"
| 131 || August 25 || Astros || L 3–1 || Sosa (1–2) || Vogelsong (10–4) || Melancon (14) || 41,115 || 69–62
|- style="text-align=:center; background:#bfb;"
| 132 || August 26 || Astros || W 2–1 || Bumgarner (8–12) || Happ (4–15) || Casilla (2) || 41,438 || 70–62
|- style="text-align=:center; background:#bfb;"
| 133 || August 27 || Astros || W 2–1 (10) || Affeldt (3–2) || Rodriguez (2–3) ||  || 42,318 || 71–62
|- style="text-align=:center; background:#fbb;"
| 134 || August 28 || Astros || L 4–3 (11) || Melancon (7–4) || Ramírez (2–3) || Carpenter (1) || 41,681 || 71–63
|- style="text-align=:center; background:#fbb;"
| 135 || August 29 || Cubs || L 7–0 || Wells (6–4) ||  Lincecum (12–11) ||  || 41,063 || 71–64
|- style="text-align=:center; background:#fbb;"
| 136 || August 30 || Cubs || L 5–2 || Garza (7–10) || Vogelsong (10–5) || Mármol (31) || 41,165 || 71–65
|- style="text-align=:center; background:#bfb;"
| 137 || August 31 || Cubs || W 4–0 || Bumgarner (9–12) || Lopez (4–6) ||  || 41,099 || 72–65
|-

|- style="text-align=:center; background:#bfb;"
| 138 || September 2 || Diamondbacks || W 6–2 || Cain (11–9) || Saunders (9–12) ||  || 40,948 || 73–65
|- style="text-align=:center; background:#fbb;"
| 139 || September 3 || Diamondbacks || L 7–2 || Kennedy (18–4) || Lincecum (12–12) ||  || 41,915 || 73–66
|- style="text-align=:center; background:#fbb;"
| 140 || September 4 || Diamondbacks || L 4–1 || Hudson (15–9) || Vogelsong (10–6) || Putz (36) || 42,222 || 73–67
|- style="text-align=:center; background:#bfb;"
| 141 || September 5 || @ Padres || W 7–2 || Bumgarner (10–12) || Stauffer (8–12) ||  || 25,066 || 74–67
|- style="text-align=:center; background:#bfb;"
| 142 || September 6 || @ Padres || W 6–4 || Surkamp (1–0) || LeBlanc (2–5) || Ramírez (4) || 21,866 || 75–67
|- style="text-align=:center; background:#fbb;"
| 143 || September 7 || @ Padres || L 3–1 || Harang (13–5) || Cain (11–10) || Bell (36) || 18,173 || 75–68
|- style="text-align=:center; background:#fbb;"
| 144 || September 9 || Dodgers || L 2–1 || Kershaw (18–5) || Casilla (2–2) || Guerra (17) || 41,902 || 75–69
|- style="text-align=:center; background:#fbb;"
| 145 || September 10 || Dodgers || L 3–0 || Eveland (2–0) || Vogelsong (10–7) || Guerra (18) || 42,121 || 75–70
|- style="text-align=:center; background:#bfb;"
| 146 || September 11 || Dodgers || W 8–1 || Bumgarner (11–12) || Kuroda (11–16) ||  || 41,466 || 76–70
|- style="text-align=:center; background:#bfb;"
| 147 || September 12 || Padres || W 8–3 || Surkamp (2–0) || Harang (13–6) ||  || 41,069 || 77–70
|- style="text-align=:center; background:#bfb;"
| 148 || September 13 || Padres || W 3–2 (12) || Ramírez (3–3) || Brach (0–2) ||  || 41,510 || 78–70
|- style="text-align=:center; background:#bfb;"
| 149 || September 14 || Padres || W 3–1 || Lincecum (13–12) || Latos (7–14) || Casilla (3) || 41,209 || 79–70
|- style="text-align=:center; background:#bfb;"
| 150 || September 15 || @ Rockies || W 8–5 || Vogelsong (11–7) || Chacín (11–12) || Casilla (4) || 34,364 || 80–70
|- style="text-align=:center; background:#bfb;"
| 151 || September 16 || @ Rockies || W 9–1 || Bumgarner (12–12) || White (3–2) ||  || 47,302 || 81–70
|- style="text-align=:center; background:#bfb;"
| 152 || September 17 || @ Rockies || W 6–5 || Joaquin (1–0) || Street (1–4) || Casilla (5) || 38,961 || 82–70
|- style="text-align=:center; background:#bfb;"
| 153 || September 18 || @ Rockies || W 12–5 || Cain (12–10) || Rogers (6–6) ||  || 31,875 || 83–70
|- style="text-align=:center; background:#fbb;"
| 154 || September 20 || @ Dodgers || L 2–1 || Kershaw (20–5) || Lincecum (13–13)|| Guerra (19) || 32,526 || 83–71
|- style="text-align=:center; background:#bfb;"
| 155 || September 21 || @ Dodgers || W 8–5 || Vogelsong (12–7) || Eveland (2–2) || Wilson (36) || 32,334 || 84–71
|- style="text-align=:center; background:#fbb;"
| 156 || September 22 || @ Dodgers || L 8–2 || Kuroda (13–16) || Bumgarner (12–13) ||  || 37,560 || 84–72
|- style="text-align=:center; background:#fbb;"
| 157 || September 23 || @ Diamondbacks || L 3–1 || Hernandez (5–3) || Cain (12–11) || Putz (44) || 42,606 || 84–73
|- style="text-align=:center; background:#fbb;"
| 158 || September 24 || @ Diamondbacks || L 15–2 || Kennedy (21–4) || Surkamp (2–1) ||  || 49,076 || 84–74
|- style="text-align=:center; background:#fbb;"
| 159 || September 25 || @ Diamondbacks || L 5–2 || Collmenter (10–10) || Lincecum (13–14) || Putz (45) || 41,243 || 84–75
|- style="text-align=:center; background:#bfb;"
| 160 || September 26 || Rockies || W 3–1 || Vogelsong (13–7) || Chacín (11–14) || Casilla (6) || 41,956 || 85–75
|- style="text-align=:center; background:#bfb;"
| 161 || September 27 || Rockies || W 7–0 || Bumgarner (13–13) || White (3–4) || || 42,370 || 86–75
|- style="text-align=:center; background:#fbb;"
| 162 || September 28 || Rockies || L 6–3 || Pomeranz (2–1) || Surkamp (2–2) || Betancourt (8) || 41,873 || 86–76
|-

Roster

Regular season stats

Batting
Note: G = Games played; AB = At bats; R = Runs scored; H = Hits; 2B = Doubles; 3B = Triples; HR = Home runs; RBI = Runs batted in; AVG = Batting average; SB = Stolen bases

Pitching
Note: W = Wins; L = Losses; ERA = Earned run average; G = Games pitched; GS = Games started; SV = Saves; IP = Innings pitched; H = His allowed; R = Runs allowed; ER = Earned runs allowed; BB = Walks allowed; K = Strikeouts

See also
The Franchise

Farm system

References

External links
2011 San Francisco Giants statistics at Baseball Reference
2011 San Francisco Giants schedule at Baseball Reference

San Francisco Giants
San Francisco Giants seasons
San Francisco Giants
2011 in San Francisco